Nicole LaLiberté (born December 1, 1981) is an American actress. She has had recurring roles on the television series How to Make It in America (2011) and Dexter (2012–2013) and most notably played Darya in David Lynch's Twin Peaks: The Return.

Career
LaLiberté moved from Upstate New York to New York City at age 12 in 1993, to study ballet at the School of American Ballet.  After years as a ballerina, she transitioned into modeling appearing in the 2002 Lavazza Calendar shot by David La Chapelle, Arthur Elgort's book Camera Crazy and in magazines including Vogue Italia, W and Photo.

LaLiberté began acting in 2007. Her first acting role was in a play that her friend Michael Domitrovich had written and wanted her to be in. Called Artfuckers, it ran Off-Off Broadway at the Theater for the New City from February 19 to March 4, 2007 and then Off-Broadway at the DR2 Theatre from February 8 to March 16, 2008. The play itself was met with mixed reviews but the performances, particularly LaLiberté's were generally praised. Mark Blankenship of Variety said that she "brings believable grit to her one-dimensional, frequently naked role as a heartless nymphette."

Her first screen performances were brief appearances in episodes of Law & Order: Criminal Intent and Rescue Me in 2007. In 2009, she played the lead role in the film My Normal, about a lesbian dominatrix with dreams of becoming a film maker, and had a small role in an episode of Nurse Jackie. In 2010, she starred in three films: Gregg Araki's film Kaboom which premiered at Cannes; the comedy Dinner for Schmucks; and Paul Morrissey's drama News from Nowhere which had its premiere at the Venice Film Festival.

Her first major role came in 2011, playing the recurring role of Lulu in the second season of HBO's How to Make It in America. That year she also appeared in the drama film Shouting Secrets. In 2012, she played Arlene Schram in the seventh season of Dexter. She also appeared in another four films: the romantic comedy Wifed Out; played a lead role in Girls Against Boys; had a small role in the comedy Nous York; and starred alongside Emily Blunt, Colin Firth and Anne Heche in Arthur Newman. In 2013, she starred in an episode of The Mentalist, reprised her role as Arlene Schram in the eighth season of Dexter and had roles in the films In a World..., written and directed by Lake Bell, and Fractured, a horror film.

She appeared as Kitty Greenburg in "Man Rots from the Head" a short written and directed by Janicza Bravo alongside Michael Cera and as Miss President in the instant midnight classic Adam Green's Aladdin. Most notable perhaps is her portrayal of Darya in the highly anticipated return of the David Lynch helmed series Twin Peaks and acid-eyed Tess in the Jim Carrey produced I'm Dying Up Here both for Showtime.

In 2018 she played the starring role, Joan of Arc, in Regarding the Case of Joan of Arc, written and directed by Matthew Wilder, which premiered at the International Film Festival of India in Goa, India.

Filmography

References

External links
 Twitter
 

21st-century American actresses
American film actresses
American television actresses
Living people
1981 births